Dollars in Surrey is a 1921 British silent comedy film directed by George Dewhurst and Anson Dyer and starring Alma Taylor, James Carew and Hugh Clifton.

Cast
 Alma Taylor 
 James Carew 
 Hugh Clifton 
 Gwynne Herbert 
 Esme Hubbard 
 Victor Prout
 Rolf Leslie 
 Wallace Bosco

References

Bibliography
 Robert B. Connelly. The Silents: Silent Feature Films, 1910-36. December Press, 1998.

External links
 

1921 films
1921 comedy films
British comedy films
British silent feature films
Films directed by George Dewhurst
British black-and-white films
Hepworth Pictures films
1920s English-language films
1920s British films
Silent comedy films